William Herbert Turner (6 July 1921 – 24 February 2002) was an Australian rules footballer in the Victorian Football League (VFL).

Nicknamed "Stumpy", Turner was a dual premiership player at Carlton. He could play in the midfield or up forward.

Turner also played first-class cricket with Victoria for whom he was a left-handed batsman and made 96 on debut against Western Australia at the MCG in 1948. In all he made 632 runs in his first-class career at an average of 33.26.

See also
 List of Victoria first-class cricketers

References

External links 

Blueseum
Cricinfo profile

1921 births
2002 deaths
Carlton Football Club players
Carlton Football Club Premiership players
Hawthorn Football Club players
Eaglehawk Football Club players
Australian cricketers
Victoria cricketers
West Melbourne Football Club players
Australian rules footballers from Bendigo
Two-time VFL/AFL Premiership players